The 1993 CA-TennisTrophy was a men's tennis tournament played on indoor carpet courts at the Wiener Stadthalle in Vienna, Austria and was part of the World Series of the 1993 ATP Tour. It was the 19th edition of the tournament and took place from 18 October until 25 October 1993. Second-seeded Goran Ivanišević won the singles title.

Champions

Singles

 Goran Ivanišević defeated  Thomas Muster 4–6, 6–4, 6–4, 7–6(7–3)
 It was Ivanišević's 2nd title of the year and the 13th of his career.

Doubles

 Byron Black /  Jonathan Stark defeated  Mike Bauer /  David Prinosil 6–3, 7–6
 It was Black's 5th title of the year and the 5th of his career. It was Stark's 6th title of the year and the 8th of his career.

References

External links
 ATP tournament profile
 ITF tournament edition details